Antonio Dias may refer to:

 Antônio Dias, a municipality in Minas Gerais, Brazil
 António Dias de Oliveira (1804–1863), Portuguese politician
 Antonio Dias (footballer) (1893–unknown), Brazilian footballer
 António Dias da Cunha (born 1933), Portuguese businessman
 António Dias Cardoso (1933–2006), Angolan politician
 Antônio de Jesus Dias (1942–2020), Brazilian pastor and politician
 Antonio Dias (artist) (1944–2018), Brazilian artist and graphic designer

See also
 Antonio Díaz (disambiguation)